Mascherato is a musical with music, lyrics and original story by Michael Elderkin and book by James Willett. 

'In the heart of 18th century Venice we meet Luca and Elena, and follow as they fall in love against the backdrop of the thriving carnival. However, the pair are torn apart as Venice sinks into war against the Ottoman Empire. When the conflict finally ends, and the empire proves victorious, the two lovers must fight against fate to be reunited.''' 

A workshop version of the show was performed in Milton Court Theatre, Barbican Centre, London in 2017. In 2020, a full studio cast recording featuring Rob Houchen, Katy Treharne, Jeremy Secomb, and Nathaniel Parker was released. The album is structured with underscored dialogue and a reduced script to allow for the full story to be told.

 Musical numbers 

 Act I
 Prologue (Score)
 Under Venetian Skies – Elena, Luca, Timeo, Company 
 To the Courtyard (Score)
 Go and See the World – Elena, Luca
 "Too Much Like Your Mother" (Score)
 See Her Again – Attilio
 Ottoman Meeting (Score)
 The Carnival Way – Elena, Luca, Attilio, Pasqualin, Timeo, Company
 Meeting Domani (Score)
 Madame Domani's Prophecy – Madame Domani
 Leaving Domani/"Farewell" (Score)
 In a Single Moment – Elena, Luca
 "Until Next Time" (Score)
 The Battle (Score) – Luca, Attilio, Leandros

 Act II
 A Year Later (Score)
 The Shop (Score)
 We're The Ottomans – Leandros, Company
 "It's Elena" (Score)
 Tailor-Made – Corto, Folletto
 In a Single Moment (Reprise) – Elena
 New Orders (Score)
 The Masquerade, Pt. 1 (Score)
 The Masquerade, Pt. 2 (Score)
 The Next Morning (Score)
 Go and See the World (Reprise) – Elena, Luca
 Poor Negotiations (Score)
 Leandros' Lament – Leandros
 Packing (Score)
 Leandros' Lament (Reprise) – Leandros
 Luca Finds Out (Score)
 What's in a Memory? – Luca
 A Race Against Time (Score)
 The Prophecy Fulfilled (Score)
 Finale (Score)
 Curtain Call (Score)

 Productions Mascherato'' was first performed as a workshop in 2017 in Milton Court Theatre, Barbican Centre as a recipient of a grant from the Guildhall School of Music and Drama, where Elderkin was studying bassoon.

A full original studio cast recording was released in 2020.

Cast

Recordings 
In 2020, the full original studio cast recording was released, met with very positive reviews. The music was recorded at Abbey Road Studios with a 22-piece orchestra and the vocals were recorded later at Masterchord Studios, in North London.

Due to the lockdown and social distancing measures put in place from Coronavirus, all the singers had to be recorded in separate sessions, even if they had dialogue together.

References

External links 

 Official website

Musical theatre
West End musicals
Broadway musicals
Off-Broadway musicals
Sung-through musicals
Venice
Orchestral music